The women's high jump at the 2002 European Athletics Championships were held at the Olympic Stadium on August 9–11.

Medalists

Results

Qualification
Qualification: Qualifying Performance 1.92 (Q) or at least 12 best performers (q) advance to the final.

Group A

Group B

Final

External links
Results

High
2002 in women's athletics